Seoul Institute of the Arts is a prominent educational institution specializing in the Arts located in Ansan, Gyeonggi Province, South Korea. The school has nurtured many graduates who are actively working in art related fields within Korea as well as internationally. The Namsan campus in the heart of Seoul is used for presentation of arts productions and convergence with industry. The Ansan Campus opened in 2001 and is used for educational training, which aims to tear down barriers between disciplines, genres, and majors. The Institute continues to be a forerunner in globalization of Korean arts and creation of new forms of arts.

Purpose of establishment 
Through theater education, it was established to overcome the breakdown of national culture caused by the Japanese colonial period and the Korean war, and to nurture professional artists who will establish and revitalize national cinema.

History
 August 1958 – Korean Theatre Research Institute was founded.
 April 1962 – Drama Center and Theatre Library were opened.
 June 1962 – Korean Theatre Academy was founded (closed March 1964).
 March 1964 – Seoul Drama School was founded (closed December 1973) 
 December 1973 – Seoul Art Academy was founded.
 December 1978 – Seoul Art Academy was renamed to Seoul Art College.
 February 1982 – Korean Theatre Research Institute was renamed to Korea Research Center for Arts.
 February 1998 – Korea Research Center for Arts was renamed to Dongnang Art Center.
 June 1998 – Seoul Art College was renamed to Seoul Institute of the Arts.
 March 2001 – Namsan Education Center was opened.
 September 2002 – Dongnang Acting Class for the Youth was opened.

Former presidents
 Prof. Yoo Duk-hyung (December 1978 – March 1994)
 Prof. Yang Jung-hyun (March 1994 – March 1998)
 Prof. Kim Ki-duk (March 1998 – March 2001)
 Ahn Min-soo (March 2001 – February 2004)
 Ro Kun-il

Departments

Notable alumni

Actors and actresses
Ahn Jae-wook
Bang Eun-hee
Cha Tae-hyun
Choi Ja-hye
Choi Jong-hwan
Choi Jong-won
Choi Min-soo
Choi Myung-gil
Dokgo Young-jae
Ga Deuk-hee
Go Bo-gyeol
Han Hye-jin
Han Joo-wan
Han Jung-soo
Han Sang-jin
Heo Joon-ho
Hong Ah-reum
Hong Eun-hee
Hwang Jung-min
Hyun Jyu-ni
Im Hyung-joon
Im Ji-eun
Im Won-hee
Jang Hyuk
Jang Hyun-sung
Jang Jin
Jang Yong
Jang Young-nam
Jeon Do-yeon
Jeon Mi-seon
Jeon Moo-song
Jin Tae-hyun
Jo Jae-yoon
Jo Jung-suk
Jo Mi-ryung
Jo Sung-ha
Jung Dong-hwan
Jung Eun-pyo
Jung Hye-young
Jung Il-woo
Jung Jae-young
Jung Woo
Jung Woong-in
Jung Yu-mi
Kang Eun-tak
Kang Hye-jung
Kang Sung-yeon
Kil Yong-woo
Kim Bo-kyung
Kim Bum
Kim Eung-soo
Kim Ha-neul
Kim Hee-won
Kim Ho-jin
Kim Hye-ok
Kim Jae-wook
Kim Ji-han
Kim Kyu-chul
Kim Min-jong
Kim Min-kyo
Kim Myung-min
Kim Na-woon
Kim San-ho
Kim Seon-ho
Kim Seul-gi
Kim Su-ro
Kim Won-hae
Kim Won-jun
Kim Yoo-mi
Kim Young-hoon
Ko Chang-seok
Ku Hye-sun
Lee Cho-hee
Lee Chun-hee
Lee Dong-gun
Lee Elijah
Lee Hwi-hyang
Lee Jong-hyuk
Lee Joon-gi
Lee Kan-hee
Lee Ki-young
Lee Pil-mo
Lee Seung-joon
Lee Si-eon
Lee Yi-kyung
Min Young-won
Moon Ji-in
On Joo-wan
Park Eun-hye
Park Eun-seok
Park Gun-hyung
Park Hee-soon
Park Hyuk-kwon
Park Jin-joo
Park Joo-mi
Park Sang-myun
Park Sang-won
Park Seo-joon
Park Sun-young
Park Hae-jin
Park Yeong-gyu
Ra Mi-ran 
Ryu Seung-ryong
Ryu Seung-soo
Ryoo Seung-bum
Seo Bum-june
Seo Ji-seok
Seol In-ah
Shin Eun-jung
Shin Goo 
Shin Ha-kyun
Shin Seung-hwan
Son Ye-jin
Son Seung-won
Song Chang-eui
Song Jae-hee
Sunwoo Eun-sook
Sunwoo Jae-duk
Woo Hee-jin
Yang Hee-kyung
Ye Ji-won
Yoo Ara
Yoo Dong-geun
Yoo Gun
Yoo Hae-jin
Yoo Ho-jeong
Yoo Se-rye
Yoon Je-moon
Yoon Ji-hye
Yoon Jin-seo
Yoon Yoo-sun

Music
Chae Yeon
Choa (Crayon Pop)
Dia
Jang Do-yoon
Jang Gyu-ri (Fromis 9)
Jang Yun-jeong
Jukjae
Jung Dong-hwan (MeloMance)
Jung Yu-ji (BESTie)
Kim Bum-soo
Kim Gun-mo
Kim Hyun-woo (DickPunks)
Kim Jae-heung (DickPunks)
Kim Jae-wook
Kim Min-seok (MeloMance)
Kim Se-yong (Myname)
Kim Tae-hyun (DickPunks)
Kim Yeon-woo
Lee Bo-ram (SeeYa)
Lee Jin-ah
Lim Jeong-hee
Lee Ki-chan
Lee Sung-min (Super Junior)
Lu Han
Maya
Meng Jia (Miss A)
Nana (After School)
Nine9 (Dear Cloud)
Park Ga-ram (DickPunks)
Park Shin-won
Shinae An Wheeler (The Barberettes)
Wang Feifei (Miss A)
Jung Hye-sun (J Rabbit)
Jung Da-woon (J Rabbit)

TV hosts
Euna Lee
Jang Yoon-ju
Lee Hwi-jae
Shin Dong-yup
Yoo Jae-suk

Authors & screenwriters
Choi In-hun
Jang Jin
Noh Hee-kyung 
Kim Ryeo-ryeong
Shin Kyung-sook
Kim Eun-sook
Ha Seong-nan

Directors & filmmakers 
Jang Jin
Lee Myung-se
Kim Jee-woon
Lee Hwan-kyung

Fashion designers 
Lie Sang Bong

Businessmen & entrepreneurs 
Kim Bong-jin

References

External links
 Official homepage (in English)

 
Universities and colleges in Gyeonggi Province
Universities and colleges in Seoul
Educational institutions established in 1962
Education in Ansan
1962 establishments in South Korea